Candere was founded in 2012 by Rupesh Jain and Ashish Bajaj as an Indian online portal for Gold, Diamond, Gemstone, Platinum jewellery and gold coins. Candere is a Latin word which means to glow or shine.

History 

Rupesh Jain, raised in a family of retail jewellers; is an IT engineer from Mumbai. He served as the Company President at Ornet Technology and as a software engineer at L&T Infotech. His fascination in integrating retail jewellery with technology piqued his interest in creating this online portal which led to his collaboration with Ashish Bajaj, the then Vice President at Miles Software Solutions, to form Candere. Ashish exit the company in 2016.

Funding 

An initial investment of 2.5 crore was made by Singularity Strategic, a Hyderabad based company, owned by Brijesh Chandwani and Subram Kapoor, which later rose to a total of 4.2 crores.

Mergers and acquisitions 
In 2017 Kalyan Jewellers, an Indian jewellery store chain owned by the Kalyan Group invested in Candere forming a partnership between both. Kalyan Group purchased the stakes and the equity held by Singularity Strategic in Candere and some part held by its founder, for a sum of 40 crores.

Operations and alliance 
Candere operates with a team of 110 employees which includes in house manufacturing of products. 
The company has partnered with e-stores like Amazon.com, Zivame, Yatra, Kotak, ICICI and HDFC.

References 

 Women's Day video campaign Launch adgully.com 07-03-2019
 Launch of first Valentine's Day video indiantelevision.com 12-02-2019 Retrieved 07-03-2019
 Online Store Candere Celebrates Launch of Stunning Miracle Plate Collection Just in Time for Valentine's Day techcircle.vccircle.com 18-01-2017 Retrieved 03-05-2017
 Candere creates customization canvas for Valentine’s Day The Telegraph India. 27-01-2017 Retrieved 03-05-2017
 This Akshay Tritiya, Candere.com revamps its Diamond Jewellery website news.webindia123.com 05-06-2016 Retrieved 03-05-2017
 Kalyan Jewellers buys online firm Candere for about Rs.40 crore economictimes.indiatimes.com. Retrieved 26-04-2017.
 Kalyan Jewellers acquires online jewellery firm Business Standard. Retrieved 26-04-2017.
 Kalyan Jewellers acquires online jewellery retailer Candere Hindustan Times Retrieved 26-04-2017.
 Kalyan buys online jewellery firm for about 40 cr India Today. Retrieved 26-04-2017.
 Candere.com Site Info Hype Stat. Retrieved 3 May 2017.
 Candere.com  Site Info Alexa Internet. Retrieved 3 May 2017.

External links 
 Official Website: 
 Official Blog Page: 

Jewellery companies of India